The 2016 Little League World Series was held from August 18 to August 28 in South Williamsport, Pennsylvania. Eight teams from the United States and eight from throughout the world competed in the 70th edition of the tournament. Maine-Endwell Little League of Maine-Endwell, New York, defeated East Seoul Little League of Seoul, South Korea, in the championship game by a 2–1 score. It was the first Little League World Series title for a team from the United States since , and for the state of New York since , and the third overall.

Teams

Regional qualifying tournaments were held between June and August 2016.

Results

The draw to determine the opening round pairings took place on June 16, 2016.

United States bracket

International bracket

Consolation games
Teams that lose their first two games get to play a crossover game against a team from the other side of the bracket that also lost its first two games. These games are labeled Game A and Game B.

Third place game
This consolation game is played between the loser of the United States championship and the loser of the International championship.

World Championship

{| class="wikitable" style="text-align: center; margin: 0 auto;"
|-
!2016 Little League World Series Champions
|-
| Maine-Endwell Little League Maine-Endwell, New York
|}

 Home run count 

Champions path
The Maine-Endwell Little League became only the third team from New York state to win the Little League World Series (the others were Schenectady in 1954 and Staten Island in 1964). The MELL reached the LLWS with an undefeated record of 19 wins and no losses;District 5 Tournament bracket in total, their record was 24–0. Red indicates lossGreen''' indicates win

References

 
2016
2016 in baseball
2016 in sports in Pennsylvania
August 2016 sports events in the United States
2016 in sports in New York (state)
2016 in South Korean sport